Paniki may refer to:

 Paniki (cutting instrument), a traditional East Indian tool
 Paniki (food), a bat dish from Indonesia
 Paniki, Kursk Oblast, a rural locality in Russia

See also 
 Paniqui, a municipality in the Philippines